James Charles Gosger (born November 6, 1942) is an American former Major League Baseball outfielder and first baseman. He played in the majors for ten seasons between 1963 and 1974 for six different teams. During his MLB career, Gosger batted .226 with 30 home runs, 177 RBI and 411 hits in 705 games played.

Gosger appeared in 555 games at center field (291), left (216) and right (83), and eventually as a first baseman (25).

History
Gosger attended St. Stephen High School in Port Huron, Michigan, where he played baseball, basketball and football. He attended St. Clair County Community College and played for their basketball team, before signing a bonus contract with the Red Sox in January 1962.

Gosger broke into the majors in 1963 with the Boston Red Sox, playing for them two and a half years before joining the Kansas City/Oakland Athletics (1966–68), Seattle Pilots (1969), New York Mets (1969), Montreal Expos (1970–71), and again with the Mets (1973–74). In 1966 with Boston and Kansas City, he posted career-highs in at bats (398), hits (93), doubles (18), home runs (10) and RBI (44) while batting .234 in 128 combined games. He was traded along with Bob Heise from the Mets to the San Francisco Giants for Ray Sadecki and Dave Marshall on December 12, 1969.

In June 2019, the Mets accidentally included Gosger in a video meant to honor deceased members of their 1969 championship team; the Mets later apologized to Gosger.

As of 2022, Gosger is living in Port Huron.

References

External links

1942 births
Living people
People from Port Huron, Michigan
Sportspeople from Metro Detroit
Baseball players from Michigan
American expatriate baseball players in Canada
Major League Baseball outfielders
Boston Red Sox players
Kansas City Athletics players
Montreal Expos players
New York Mets players
Oakland Athletics players
Seattle Pilots players
Winston-Salem Red Sox players
Tidewater Tides players
Winnipeg Whips players
Phoenix Giants players
Vancouver Mounties players
Buffalo Bisons (minor league) players
Reading Red Sox players
Toronto Maple Leafs (International League) players
Florida Instructional League Red Sox players